Parmena slamai is a species of beetle in the family Cerambycidae. It was described by Sama in 1986. It is known from Crete.

References

Parmenini
Beetles described in 1986